No Rules is the third studio album released by American country music artist Rebecca Lynn Howard. It is her first full studio album in six years, as she recorded two unreleased albums in the interim: one in 2003 for MCA Nashville, and another in 2005 for Arista Nashville. She also released a non-charting single in 2006 for Show Dog Nashville, a label owned by Toby Keith.

No Rules features strong southern soul influences.
The album includes covers of Aretha Franklin's 1967 hit "Do Right Woman, Do Right Man", The Temptations' 1975 funk classic "Shakey Ground", and  "We're in This Love Together", originally by soul/jazz singer Al Jarreau.

The album reached #69 on the Billboard Top Country Albums chart. "Sing 'Cause I Love To" was released as a single but failed to chart.

Track listing 
"Shakey Ground" (Al Boyd, Eddie Hazel, Jeffrey Bowen) – 3:42
"New Twist on an Old Groove" (Michael Curtis, Rebecca Lynn Howard) – 3:48
"Do Right Woman, Do Right Man" (Chips Moman, Dan Penn) – 3:22
"Soul Sisters" (Howard, Will McFarlane, Michael Curtis) – 3:35
"What Dying Feels Like" (Howard, Rachel Thibodeau) – 4:22
"Better Someday" (Howard) – 3:54
"Just Let It Burn" (Howard, Thibodeau, Robin Lee Bruce) – 2:48
"As One as Two Can Be" (Howard, Patrick Jason Matthews) – 4:12
"Sing 'Cause I Love To" (Howard, Radney Foster) – 4:20
"Real Love" (Howard, Curtis, Teddy Gentry) – 4:01
"I'm Over You" (Howard, Thibodeau) – 4:03
"The Life of a Dollar" (Howard, Thibodeau) – 3:20
"We're in This Love Together" (Roger Murrah, Keith Stegall) – 3:17
"Throw It Down" (Kree Harrison, Howard) – 2:51

Chart performance

References 

Allmusic (see infobox)

2008 albums
Rebecca Lynn Howard albums